Donald D. Maestri Jr. (born October 25, 1946) is an American college basketball coach who was the head men's basketball coach at Troy University from 1982 to 2013. Prior to accepting this position, Maestri was an assistant coach at Mississippi State University from 1979 to 1980 and at the University of Alabama from 1980 to 1982. Maestri coached the Trojans to a record of 500–404, one NCAA basketball tournament, five regular season conference titles, and one conference tournament title over the course of 26 seasons at Troy. He has been named coach of the year in the East Coast Conference (1994), the Summit League (1997, then known as the Mid-Continent Conference), Atlantic Sun Conference (2000 and 2004) and the Sun Belt Conference (2009)

Maestri is famous for his run and gun style of basketball, which has led the Trojans to lead Division I NCAA basketball in three-pointers per game three consecutive seasons, from 2003 to 2006. He also coached Troy to a 258–141 win over the DeVry Institute of Atlanta on January 12, 1992, which is the highest scoring basketball game in NCAA history. Ironically, his emphasis on defensive pressure and a lock-down style of basketball pushed the Trojans to two Division II Final Fours in six years.

Five different conferences have called Maestri its Coach of the Year, tying him with West Virginia's Bob Huggins for the most among active coaches.

He earned his 500th career win against Florida Atlantic in the Sun Belt Conference tournament in 2013.  Maestri retired from the program on March 9, 2013.

Early life and education
Maestri grew up in New Orleans and graduated from De La Salle High School in 1964. After high school, Maestri attended the University of Southern Mississippi in Hattiesburg, Mississippi, where he graduated in 1968 with a double major B.S. in mathematics and physical education. After graduating from Southern Mississippi, Maestri stayed in Hattiesburg to work as a math and physical education teacher at Beeson Academy in the 1968–69 school year.

Coaching career

High school and college assistant (1970–1982)

Maestri began his coaching career in the fall of 1970 at Holy Cross High School in his hometown of New Orleans.  In 10 seasons as coach, he posted a 211–99 record, leading Holy Cross to a state runner-up finish in the top classification in the Louisiana high school ranks in 1974. This 1974 team had a final record of 35–6.

His 1976 team finished with a 32–3 record and was ranked 11th in the nation.

Maestri's teams also finished 1st or 2nd place six times in the Catholic League.

Maestri spent the 1979–80 season as an assistant coach for Jim Hatfield at Mississippi State.  During his one year with the program, the Bulldogs finished with a 13–14 record and tied for 6th in the Southeastern Conference.

Maestri spent two seasons at the University of Alabama on Winfrey Sanderson's staff (1980–82).  During his time with the Crimson Tide, Alabama participated in the NIT and NCAA tournaments.

Alabama finished 24–7 in 1982, winning the Southeastern Conference Tournament and advancing to the NCAA East Regional.

Troy (1982–2013)

Maestri was named the head coach of the Troy University basketball team in 1982.  When he took over the reins of the Troy basketball program, the Trojans had not posted a winning season in the previous five seasons.

Maestri quickly turned the program into a perennial Division II powerhouse.  He led the Trojans to a Gulf South Conference title in the 1990–91 season, where they received an invitation to the NCAA tournament, defeating Florida Southern 78–73 in the 1st Round before falling to North Alabama 86–93 in the 2nd round.  He was named Gulf South Coach of the Year for his efforts.

The head coach led Troy State to five NCAA Tournament appearances in 1988, 1990, 1991, 1992 and 1993.  Maestri finished with an overall record of 237–131 in Division II.

During the 1987–88 season, the Trojans finished with a 24–10, winning the Gulf South Conference title.  Troy State made it to the Elite Eight of the NCAA Tournament before falling 77–72 to Alaska–Anchorage.

Five seasons later, in 1992–93, Maestri helped the Trojans to a 27–5 record and led them to the NCAA Tournament finals, only to fall to Cal State Bakersfield 85–72.  Maestri was named Southeast Region Coach of the Year by the NCAA following his team's brilliant season.

During Troy's first season at the Division I level, 1993–94, Maestri's run-and-gun style shot the Trojans to a conference title, going undefeated in the East Coast Conference and winning the conference title. Troy also gained national recognition by leading the nation in three-pointers made per game while averaging 97.6 points per contest.  For his efforts, Maestri was named East Coast Conference Coach of the Year.

In 1995, Troy State left the East Coast Conference to join the Mid-Continent Conference (now the Summit League).

During the 1996–97 season, the Trojans were back in contention in the Mid-Continent Conference, upsetting Sweet 16 participant Valparaiso, 72–69, on the road in overtime to cap a 17–10 record. Troy claimed third place in the conference that year, with Maestri earning Coach of the Year honors again.

The Trojans left the Mid-Continent Conference to join the Atlantic Sun Conference in 1998.  Maestri's teams struggled mightily their first two seasons in the Atlantic Sun in 1998 and 1999, but quickly turned their fortunes around the next season.  In 2000, Maestri brought the Trojans their first conference title in six years and their first Division I conference title.  Though the Trojans won the regular season title that year, they did not win the conference tournament, thus keeping them from getting in the NCAA tournament.

Two seasons later, in the 2001–02 season, Maestri was once again able to lead his team to another Atlantic Sun regular season title.  Once again though, his Trojans failed to win the conference tournament and were once again left out of the NCAA Tournament.

In the 2002–03, Maestri recorded his best season ever in Division I.  He coached his team to a 26–6 record and they won the Atlantic Sun regular season and conference tournament titles.  During the season, the team defeated a Southeastern Conference for the first time ever, defeating Arkansas 74–66.  The Trojans received their first ever invitation to the NCAA Tournament as a Division I program.  They fell to Xavier 59–71 in the 1st round.

The very next season, 2003–04, Maestri once again coached Troy to an Atlantic Sun regular season title for the third consecutive time and finished the season with an 18–2 conference record and a 24–7 record overall.  To this day the 18 league victories is the highest single-season total for any Atlantic Sun school.  The veteran coach earned A-Sun Coach of the Year honors.  Maestri's Trojans received an invitation to the NIT, where they would be defeated in the first round by Niagara, 83–87. The Trojans finished the year second in Division I in scoring at 84.6 points per game, and ninth in scoring margin, winning by an average of 12.0 points per game. Troy also led all of college basketball in three-point field goals made with 346.

In 2005, Troy joined the Sun Belt Conference.  Maestri's teams did not finish with a winning record from the 2004–05 season to the 2007–08 season.

Maestri was finally able to coach his team to winning record once again during the 2008–09 season.  Troy finished with a 19–13 record and received an invitation to the CBI tournament, where they were defeated by the College of Charleston in the 1st round, 91–93.  Maestri was awarded the Sun Belt Coach of the Year and was also named Coach of the Year by highly respected CollegeInsider.com following the successful campaign.

During Maestri's 2009–10 campaign, the Trojans finished with a 20–13 record and recorded the programs first-ever win over in-state opponent Auburn, upsetting the Tigers in Beard–Eaves Coliseum by a score of 81–77.  His team went on to win the Sun Belt regular season title and compete in the NIT tournament.

He retired from Troy after the 2013 season, finishing with a 501–403 overall record as head coach at Troy.

Later career (2016–2018)
Three years after Maestri's retirement from Troy, he joined the Texas A&M Aggies men's basketball staff in 2016 as a special assistant to head coach Billy Kennedy, whom Maestri had mentored since Kennedy was in the eighth grade at Holy Cross High School in Louisiana.

Head coaching record

References

1946 births
Living people
Alabama Crimson Tide men's basketball coaches
American men's basketball coaches
Basketball coaches from Louisiana
College men's basketball head coaches in the United States
High school basketball coaches in Louisiana
Mississippi State Bulldogs men's basketball coaches
Schoolteachers from Louisiana
Sportspeople from New Orleans
Texas A&M Aggies men's basketball coaches
Troy Trojans men's basketball coaches
University of Southern Mississippi alumni